The 1935 Paris–Tours was the 30th edition of the Paris–Tours cycle race and was held on 5 May 1935. The race started in Paris and finished in Tours. The race was won by René Le Grevès.

General classification

References

1935 in French sport
1935
May 1935 sports events